Senator Hyde may refer to:

DeWitt Hyde (1909–1986), Maryland State Senate
E. B. Hyde (1849–1917), Washington State Senate
Edwin Hyde (1828–1909), Wisconsin State Senate
Ephraim H. Hyde (1812–1896), Connecticut State Senate
Thomas W. Hyde (1841–1899), Maine State Senate

See also
Cindy Hyde-Smith (born 1959), U.S. Senator from Mississippi